Russell Scott Valentino (born 1962) is an American author, literary scholar, translator, and editor. Currently, he is a professor of Slavic and comparative literature, and serves as chair of the Department of Slavic and East European Languages and Cultures, at Indiana University, Bloomington.

Life and career 
Russell Scott Valentino was born and raised in central California. He attended California State University, Fresno, majoring in English and Russian, then went to graduate school at the University of California, Los Angeles, where he received his Ph.D. in Slavic Languages and Literatures, with a focus on the Russian nineteenth century. He has published eight book-length literary translations (from Italian, Russian, and Croatian), two scholarly monographs, three co-edited collections of essays, and numerous articles and essays. He served as Editor-in-Chief at the Iowa Review from 2009 to 2013, as President of the American Literary Translators Association from 2013 to 2016, and as chair of the Department of Slavic and East European Languages and Cultures at Indiana University from 2013 to 2016.

Works

Scholarly Monographs 
Vicissitudes of Genre in the Russian Novel (2001) explores genre mixing in works by Ivan Turgenev, Fyodor Dostoevsky, Nikolai Chernyshevsky, and Maksim Gorky.

The Woman in the Window: Commerce, Consensual Fantasy, and the Quest for Masculine Virtue in the Russian Novel (2014) examines the historical construction of virtue and its relation to the rapidly shifting economic context in modern Russia.

Translations 
Materada, by Fulvio Tomizza (from the Italian)
Persuasion and Rhetoric, by Carlo Michelstaedter (from the Italian, with David Depew, and Cinzia Sartini Blum)
Between Exile and Asylum: An Eastern Epistolary, by Predrag Matvejević (from the Croatian)
A Castle in Romagna, by Igor Štiks (from the Croatian, with Tomislav Kuzmanović)
The Silence of the Sufi, by Sabit Madaliev (from the Russian)
Anima Mundi, by Susanna Tamaro (from the Italian, with Cinzia Sartini Blum)
The Other Venice: Secrets of the City, by Predrag Matvejević (from the Croatian)
Kin, by Miljenko Jergović (from the Croatian). New York: Archipelago Books, 2021.

Co-edited Collections and Special Issues 
Discoveries: New Writing from the Iowa Review, edited with Erica Mena

The Man Between: Michael Henry Heim & A Life in Translation, edited with Esther Allen and Sean Cotter

Project on the Rhetoric of Inquiry Special Issue on Rhetoric and Translation, with Jacob Emery, Sibelan Forrestor, and Tomislav Kuzmanović

Awards and Fellowships 
Fulbright-Hays Faculty Research Award (1999-2000)

National Endowment for the Arts Literary Translation Award (2002)

Long-list Nominee for the International Dublin Literary Award (2005)

Howard Foundation Award for Literary Translation (2005)

National Endowment for the Arts Literary Translation Award (2010)

National Endowment for the Arts Literary Translation Award (2016)

PEN/Heim Translation Award (2016)

References

1962 births
Living people
University of California, Los Angeles alumni
American translators